Christopher Michael Byrne (1886 – 12 April 1958) was an Irish politician whose career as a Teachta Dála (TD) and Senator came in two distinct periods, separated by a decade's gap and a change of party. He was also involved in the Gaelic Athletic Association (GAA).

Personal life
He was born in Blackrock, County Dublin, and educated at Blackrock College. He married Lucy Cullen in 1919, they had no children.

Politics
Byrne was first elected to the Second Dáil as Sinn Féin TD for Kildare–Wicklow, at the 1921 general election. He was re-elected the following year as a pro-Treaty Sinn Féin candidate, and returned at the 1923 general election as a Cumann na nGaedheal TD for the Wicklow constituency. In 1926 he resigned from Cumann na nGaedheal over the results of the Irish Boundary Commission and later joined Clann Éireann with other politicians who also opposed the results.

He stood as an independent candidate at the June 1927 general election, but lost his seat. He was again unsuccessful as an independent at the next election, in September 1927 and at the 1932 general election. He did not stand in 1933, but was a Fianna Fáil candidate at the 1937 general election. He did not win a seat on that occasion, but in the subsequent elections to the 2nd Seanad in 1938, he was elected on the Administrative Panel and re-elected later that year to the 3rd Seanad.

At the 1943 general election, he returned to Dáil Éireann as a Fianna Fáil TD for Wicklow. However, he lost his seat at the 1944 general election, to his Fianna Fáil running-mate Thomas Brennan. Byrne stood again in the 1948 general election, but was not re-elected.  He then retired from national politics.

Sports
Byrne had membership of the Ashford GAA club. In 1907, he served as Ashford's delegate to the county convention which was held in Aughrim. In 1908, he became the Leinster Provincial Council representative on the GAA's Central Council. He severed as chairman of the Wicklow County Board between 1931 and 1954.

References

1886 births
1958 deaths
Chairmen of county boards of the Gaelic Athletic Association
Cumann na nGaedheal TDs
Fianna Fáil senators
Fianna Fáil TDs
Early Sinn Féin TDs
Gaelic games administrators
Irish farmers
Members of the 2nd Dáil
Members of the 3rd Dáil
Members of the 4th Dáil
Members of the 2nd Seanad
Members of the 3rd Seanad
Members of the 11th Dáil
People of the Irish Civil War (Pro-Treaty side)
Politicians from County Wicklow
Wicklow County Board administrators
People educated at Blackrock College